Salvador Mota Moreno (30 November 1922 – 20 February 1986) was a Mexican football goalkeeper who played for Mexico in the 1954 FIFA World Cup.

References

External links
FIFA profile

1922 births
1986 deaths
Footballers from Guadalajara, Jalisco
Mexican footballers
Mexico international footballers
Association football goalkeepers
Atlante F.C. footballers
1954 FIFA World Cup players